The Dance and the Railroad is a 1981 play by American playwright David Henry Hwang. His second play, it depicts a strike in a coolie railroad labor camp in the mid-nineteenth century American West. The play premiered as part of a commission by the New Federal Theatre in 1981. It had its professional debut on July 16, 1981 Off-Broadway at the Joseph Papp Public Theater. It was directed by John Lone, with Lone and Tzi Ma in the cast.

Ma cited that Hwang would often rewrite the play during rehearsals.

The play was adapted and produced on television by the ABC Arts channel, under the direction of Emile Ardolino. This production won a CINE Golden Eagle Award.

An Off-Broadway revival was produced in 2013 at the Signature Theatre under the direction of May Adrales.

It is published as part of Trying to Find Chinatown: The Selected Plays by Theatre Communications Group and also in an acting edition published by Dramatists Play Service.

References

Plays by David Henry Hwang
1981 plays